William Robertson Breckinridge (October 16, 1907 – August 23, 1958) was a pitcher in Major League Baseball. He played three games for the Philadelphia Athletics in 1929. He later practiced law in Tulsa, Oklahoma.

Personal life 
Breckinridge was the son-in-law of oil entrepreneur Waite Phillips, marrying his daughter Helen Jane Phillips on December 22, 1932, in Benton, Arkansas. The couple had two sons, Phillips and Peyton Anthony; Peyton was elected an Oklahoma legislator in 1968, serving the 38th house district in the 32nd Oklahoma Legislature, and then 8 years as a state senator. His grandson, Phillips' son Flint, served the 78th house district in the 43rd and 44th Oklahoma legislatures.

References

External links

 

1907 births
1958 deaths
Major League Baseball pitchers
Philadelphia Athletics players
Baseball players from Oklahoma
Sportspeople from Tulsa, Oklahoma